Cameron McCarthy (born 1 April 1995) is an Australian rules footballer who last played for the Fremantle Football Club in the Australian Football League (AFL). He previously played for the Greater Western Sydney Giants from 2013 to 2016.

Early career
McCarthy came from a cricket background and focused on becoming a footballer after being the last player chosen in the Western Australia under 18 team in 2013, this was due to his talents in both cricket and football. He chose the AFL pathway after some inspiration from a South Fremantle colts coach. He came to prominence with an impressive AFL Under 18 Championships with the highlight being when he kicked the after-the-siren winning goal for Western Australia against Vic Country in round four of the Championships, before suffering a broken leg in the final round against South Australia.

AFL career
He was drafted by the Greater Western Sydney Giants with pick 14 in the 2013 AFL draft. He made his debut in round 23, 2014 against the Western Bulldogs at Etihad Stadium, McCarthy started the game as the substitute, but kicked a long goal from the boundary line with his first kick in AFL football.

On 10 September 2015, news broke that McCarthy was requesting a trade to his home state of Western Australia, the next day, Greater Western Sydney "categorically rejected" his trade request due to him being contracted until the end of the 2017 season. Despite persistent efforts by  during the trade period, he remained at Greater Western Sydney. After the failed bid to move to Fremantle during the home period, McCarthy decided to return to Western Australia due to homesickness and did not play for the entirety of the 2016 AFL season. He was officially traded to Fremantle during the 2016 trade period.

In 2017, McCarthy kicked 25 goals from 19 games. He finished first in Fremantle's leading goal kicking. He was suspended for two weeks in round 15 for careless contact with St Kilda's Sam Gilbert. He was also surprisingly omitted from the round 23 team who took on Essendon. His most noted performance came in Round 4 where he kicked a late goal, with a toe-poke deep in the goal square, with 2 minutes remaining to lead Fremantle to a 2-point victory over Melbourne, in Melbourne. Another impressive performance was a 4-goal haul, with 18 disposals, against Gold Coast in round 20 at Domain Stadium.

In 2019, ahead of the Round 1 clash with North Melbourne, McCarthy was called up to the senior team seemingly as a replacement for new recruit Jesse Hogan, despite not playing in either pre-season match. He was arguably Fremantle's best player in the demolition of North Melbourne in a career-best performance, kicking five goals and collecting 20 disposals.

In August of 2020, McCarthy was notified by the Fremantle Football Club that he would not be receiving a contract for the 2021 AFL Season; McCarthy and Fremantle mutually parted ways.

Statistics
 Statistics are correct to the end of the 2020 season

|- style="background-color: #EAEAEA"
! scope="row" style="text-align:center" | 2014
|style="text-align:center;"|
| 25 || 1 || 1 || 0 || 3 || 2 || 5 || 2 || 2 || 1.0 || 0.0 || 3.0 || 2.0 || 5.0 || 2.0 || 2.0
|- 
! scope="row" style="text-align:center" | 2015
|style="text-align:center;"|
| 25 || 20 || 35 || 14 || 132 || 48 || 180 || 73 || 24 || 1.8 || 0.7 || 6.6 || 2.4 || 9.0 || 3.6 || 1.2
|-  style="background-color: #EAEAEA"
! scope="row" style="text-align:center" | 2016
|style="text-align:center;"|
| 25 || 0 || — || — || — || — || — || — || — || — || — || — || — || — || — || —
|-  style="background-color: #EAEAEA"
! scope="row" style="text-align:center" | 2017
|style="text-align:center;"|
|23 || 19 || 25 || 19 || 150 || 65 || 215 || 65 || 45 || 1.3 || 1 || 7.9 || 3.4 || 11.3 || 3.4 || 2.4
|-  style="background-color: #EAEAEA"
! scope="row" style="text-align:center" | 2018
|style="text-align:center;"|
|23 || 17 || 19 || 17 || 107 || 62 || 169 || 65 || 30 || 1.1 || 1 || 6.3 || 3.6 || 9.9 || 3.8 || 1.8
|-  style="background-color: #EAEAEA"
! scope="row" style="text-align:center" | 2019
|style="text-align:center;"|
|23 || 12 || 19 || 7 || 94 || 42 || 136 || 49 || 15 || 1.6 || 0.6 || 7.8 || 3.5 || 11.3 || 4.1 || 1.3
|-  style="background-color: #EAEAEA"
! scope="row" style="text-align:center" | 2020
|style="text-align:center;"|
|23 || 1 || 0 || 1 || 8 || 3 || 11 || 3 || 1 || 0 || 1 || 8 || 3 || 11 || 3 || 1
|-  style="background-color: #EAEAEA"
|- class="sortbottom"
! colspan=3| Career
! 70
! 99
! 58
! 494
! 222
! 716
! 257
! 117
! ~
! ~
! ~
! ~
! ~
! ~
! ~
|}

References

External links

1995 births
Living people
South Fremantle Football Club players
Australian rules footballers from Western Australia
Greater Western Sydney Giants players
Fremantle Football Club players
Peel Thunder Football Club players